Seddon Park is a cricket ground in Hamilton, New Zealand. It is the fourth-largest cricket ground in the country, and is renowned for its "village green" setting, affording a picnic atmosphere for spectators.

History
Seddon Park was named after Richard Seddon, the longest-serving Prime Minister of New Zealand. Hamilton Borough Council named it in July 1906 before it was developed. It was first used for a major cricket match in February 1914, when the touring Australians played a South Auckland XVIII in a two-day match. It has been in constant use since.

Due to sponsorship from Trust Bank and subsequently Westpac, the ground was known as Trust Bank Park from 1990 to 1997, as WestpacTrust Park from 1997 to 2003, and as Westpac Park from 2003 to 2006. It reverted to its original name in 2006, when Westpac decided to end its sponsorship of a number of sporting events and grounds in New Zealand.

Seddon Park staged one of the matches in the 1992 Cricket World Cup and three matches in the 2015 Cricket World Cup.

Australia are scheduled to play a test match in March 2024 to mark the return to test cricket in Hamilton for the first time since 2020/21.

Ground
Seddon Park is a round, well-grassed ground with a centre block of nine pitches, running approximately north to south. These pitches are usually very good for batting. There is an embankment going around three-quarters of the perimeter, with a tall hedgerow outside this embankment.

In addition to cricket, Seddon Park has been used for rugby union, rugby league and hockey matches. It therefore has a flexible stadium environment that can be modified according to sports events.

Usage and statistics
Seddon Park has been used for first-class cricket since the 1956–57 season, coinciding with the formation of the Northern Districts Cricket Association and the inclusion of the Northern Districts cricket team in the Plunket Shield competition.

The ground is used for hosting Twenty20 International matches, One Day International matches as well as Test matches. It has hosted a total of 9 T20Is, 34 ODIs and 25 Test matches. The first ODI played here was between New Zealand and India on 15 February 1981, which New Zealand won by 57 runs. The first Test match was played on 22–26 February 1991, between New Zealand and Sri Lanka, which was a draw.

Kane Williamson has the highest Test score on the ground, 251 versus West Indies in 2020, whilst Ross Taylor holds the highest Test aggregate for the ground of 908 runs.

The ground was also used for one season in 2001 for the majority of Waikato and Chiefs rugby home games. Temporary stands were raised for the games. Rugby returned to the newly built Waikato Stadium for the following year.

Cricket World Cups
This stadium has hosted One Day International (ODI) matches for all editions of the World cups, when New Zealand was a co-host.

ICC World Cup 2019, 1st Match, Group B

ICC World Cup 2015, 17th Match, Group B

ICC World Cup 2015, 19th Match, Group A

Tests record for ground
Highest totals : 715/6d (163 overs) by New Zealand v Bangladesh on 28 Feb 2019High scores : 251 (412) by Kane Williamson v West Indies on 3 December 2020

See also
 List of Test cricket grounds

References

External links

 CricketArchive entry
 Cricinfo entry
 CricketWeb entry

Sports venues in Hamilton, New Zealand
Test cricket grounds in New Zealand
Cricket grounds in New Zealand
1992 Cricket World Cup stadiums
2015 Cricket World Cup stadiums